Jonnalagadda Radhika Rao (born 27 March 1971) is an Indian film director. She started her career with her feature film directorial debut Lucky: No Time for Love (2005) with Vinay Sapru. Her next films were I Love NY (2015) and Sanam Teri Kasam (2016).
Radhika Rao also runs a film production company Rao & Sapru with her business partner Vinay Sapru.

Filmography
Filmography / Songs / Music Videos  
Songs / Music Videos

Filmography / Feature Films - Director
Filmography / Feature Films / Director

Ad Films

References

1972 births
Living people
Film directors from Maharashtra
Indian women film directors
Women artists from Maharashtra
Indian women film producers
Film producers from Maharashtra
20th-century Indian film directors
21st-century Indian film directors
20th-century Indian women